Protein SCO1 homolog, mitochondrial, also known as SCO1, cytochrome c oxidase assembly protein, is a protein that in humans is encoded by the SCO1 gene. SCO1 localizes predominantly to blood vessels, whereas SCO2 is barely detectable, as well as to tissues with high levels of oxidative phosphorylation. The expression of SCO2 is also much higher than that of SCO1 in muscle tissue, while SCO1 is expressed at higher levels in liver tissue than SCO2. Mutations in both SCO1 and SCO2 are associated with distinct clinical phenotypes as well as tissue-specific cytochrome c oxidase (complex IV) deficiency.

Structure 
SCO1 is located on the p arm of chromosome 17 in position 13.1 and has 6 exons. The SCO1 gene produces a 33.8 kDa protein composed of 301 amino acids. The protein is a member of the SCO1/2 family. It contains 3 copper metal binding sites at positions 169, 173, and 260, a transit peptide, a 25 amino acid topological domain from positions 68–92, a 19 amino acid helical transmembrane domain from positions 93–111, and a 190 amino acid topological domain from positions 112–301 in the mitochondrial intermembrane. Additionally, SCO1 has been predicted to contain 10 beta-strands, 7 helixes, and 2 turns and is a single-pass membrane protein.

Function 

Mammalian cytochrome c oxidase (COX) catalyzes the transfer of reducing equivalents from cytochrome c to molecular oxygen and pumps protons across the inner mitochondrial membrane. In yeast, 2 related COX assembly genes, SCO1 and SCO2 (synthesis of cytochrome c oxidase), enable subunits 1 and 2 to be incorporated into the holoprotein. This gene is the human homolog to the yeast SCO1 gene. It is predominantly expressed in muscle, heart, and brain tissues, which are also known for their high rates of oxidative phosphorylation. SCO1 is a copper metallochaperone that is located in the inner mitochondrial membrane and is important for the maturation and stabilization of cytochrome c oxidase subunit II (MT-CO2/COX2). It plays a role in the regulation of copper homeostasis by controlling the localization and abundance of CTR1 and is responsible for the transportation of copper to the Cu(A) site on MT-CO2/COX2.

Clinical relevance 

Mutations in the SCO1 gene are associated with hepatic failure and encephalopathy resulting from mitochondrial complex IV deficiency also known as cytochrome c oxidase deficiency. This is a disorder of the mitochondrial respiratory chain with heterogeneous clinical manifestations, ranging from isolated myopathy to severe multisystem disease affecting several tissues and organs. Features include hypertrophic cardiomyopathy, hepatomegaly, and liver dysfunction, hypotonia, muscle weakness, exercise intolerance, developmental delay, delayed motor development, mental retardation, and lactic acidosis. Some affected individuals manifest fatal hypertrophic cardiomyopathy resulting in neonatal death. A subset of patients also suffers from Leigh syndrome. Specifically, cases of pathogenic SCO1 mutations have resulted in fatal infantile encephalopathy, neonatal-onset hepatic failure, and severe hepatopathy. The P174L and M294V mutations have been identified and implicated in these diseases and phenotypes. It has also been suggested that mutations in SCO1, as well as SCO2, can result in a cellular copper deficiency, which can occur separately from cytochrome c oxidase assembly defects.

Model organisms 

Model organisms have been used in the study of SCO1 function. A conditional knockout mouse line, called Sco1tm1a(KOMP)Wtsi was generated as part of the International Knockout Mouse Consortium program—a high-throughput mutagenesis project to generate and distribute animal models of disease.

Male and female animals underwent a standardized phenotypic screen to determine the effects of deletion. Twenty-two tests were carried out on mutant mice and two significant abnormalities were observed.  No homozygous mutant embryos were identified during gestation, and therefore none survived until weaning. The remaining tests were carried out on heterozygous mutant adult mice; no additional significant abnormalities were observed in these animals.

Interactions 
SCO1 has been shown to have 127 binary protein-protein interactions including 120 co-complex interactions. SCO1 interacts with COA6, TMEM177, COX20, COX16, COX17, WDR19, CIDEB, and UBC7. It is also found in a complex with TMEM177, COX20, COA6, MT-CO2/COX2, COX18, and SCO2.

References

Further reading 

 
 
 
 
 
 
 
 
 
 
 
 
 
 

Genes mutated in mice